Major General Patrick Cammaert (born April 11, 1950, Nijmegen) is a retired Dutch general who served as the United Nations Force Commander for the Eastern Democratic Republic of the Congo. He was previously the Military Advisor to the Secretary-General of the United Nations. Prior to that position, he was the Force Commander of the United Nations Mission in Ethiopia and Eritrea (UNMEE), as the Military Adviser in the Department of Peacekeeping Operations, and has spent a career in the Royal Netherlands Marines specializing in peacekeeping operations.

Cammaert is notable for having implemented many of the recommendations of the Brahimi Report.

UN peacekeeping
In 2005 Cammaert took command of the 15,000-strong UN peacekeeping force in Eastern Democratic Republic of the Congo. His principle during this mission was that "UN forces are impartial and not neutral". In early 2005 Cammaert's Eastern Division killed 50 fighters in Ituri after losing nine of its own soldiers in an ambush.

In early 2016, Cammaert led a Headquarters-Board of Inquiry on the circumstances of the clashes that occurred in the United Nations Mission in South Sudan (UNMISS) protection of civilians site in Malakal, South Sudan, on 17–18 February 2016. Later that year, he was appointed by United Nations Secretary-General Ban Ki-moon to lead an independent special investigation into the violence in Juba, South Sudan, in July 2016, and the response of the UNMISS.

On 22 December 2018 Cammaert started leading the UN monitoring mission to oversee the UN-brokered ceasefire and redeployment of forces in the city of Al Hudaydah in Yemen. On 17 January 2019, Cammaert's convoy was reported to have been fired upon by unknown assailants, thought Cammaert remained uninjured. By February 2019, he was replaced with Danish Major General Michael Anker Lollesgaard.

Cammaert is also a regular senior mentor at UN Senior Leadership Courses and at Intensive Orientation Courses for new force commanders. In 2015, he was a member of the High Level Advisory Group for the global study on United Nations Security Council Resolution 1325.

Other activities
 Center for Civilians in Conflict (CIVIC), Member of the Board of Directors
 Mukomeze Foundation, Member of the Board
 Georgetown Institute for Women, Peace and Security, Member of the Advisory Board
 Roméo Dallaire Child Soldiers Initiative, Member of the Board

Recognition
On October 10, 2008, Cammaert received the Carnegie Wateler Peace Prize for his commitment to world peace.

References

Sources
Biography at monuc.org

Living people
People from Alkmaar
Royal Netherlands Marine Corps generals
Royal Netherlands Marine Corps officers
1950 births